Dipak Patel may refer to:
Dipak Patel (politician) (born 1953), Zambian politician
Dipak Patel (cricketer, born 1958), Kenyan cricketer who played for New Zealand
Dipak Patel (cricketer, born 1961), Kenyan cricketer